Rabbi Israel ben Joseph Alnaqua (Hebrew: ישראל בן יוסף אלנאקוה)  (also, "Al-Nakawa", "Al-Nakava", "Ankava", "Ankoa", "Alnucawi", etc., Hebrew: "נקוה", "אלנאקוה", "אנקווה", "אנקאווא") (died 1391) was an ethical writer and martyr who lived in Toledo, Spain.  He died at the stake, together with Judah ben Asher, in the summer of 1391.

He is the author of an ethical work in twenty chapters, entitled Menorat ha-Maor (Shining Candelabra). The work commences with a long poem, an acrostic on the author's name. Then follows a preface in rimed prose. The introduction to each chapter is headed by a poem, giving the acrostic of his name, Israel. It was printed in 1578. A manuscript of it is in the Bodleian. An abridgment of it was published at Cracow, 1593, under the title Menorat Zahav Kullah (Candelabra Wholly of Gold). It is divided into five sections, which contain observations
 on laws in general
 on education
 on commerce
 on the behavior of litigants and judges in court
 on conduct toward one's fellow men.

This is supplemented by a treatise, שפת אליהו רבה, consisting of Talmudic and midrashic sayings and maxims, which has been published in German (Hebrew characters) in Wagenseil's Belehrung der Jüd.-Deutschen Red-und Schreibart, Königsberg, 1699.

Other family members
 Ephraim Alnaqua

Jewish Encyclopedia bibliography
Zunz, Z. G. p. 435;
Benjacob, Oẓar ha-Sefarim, p. 337, No. 1436;
Steinschneider, Cat. Bodl. No. 5447;
S. Schechter, Monatsschrift, xxxiv. 114, 234.

See also
 Hasidic philosophy
 R' Zusha of Hanipol, author of "Menorat Zahav"

References

1391 deaths
Jewish writers
Year of birth missing
Spanish Jews
People from Toledo, Spain
Jewish martyrs
Executed Spanish people
People executed by Spain by burning